The Indian National Congress presidential election, 2017 was held in December 2017 to elect the President of the Indian National Congress. Rahul Gandhi was elected unopposed President of the Congress. The last party presidential election was held in 2001, where Rahul Gandhi's mother Sonia Gandhi was elected president.

References

2017 elections in India
2017 in Indian politics
Indian National Congress events
December 2017 events in India